= Gujarat Local Authorities Laws (Amendment) Act, 2009 =

- Status: In force

The Gujarat Local Authorities Laws (Amendment) Act, 2009 is a law passed by the Gujarat Assembly in December 2009. The act provides for reservation of 50% seat in local government and makes voting compulsory. The act amended the Bombay Provincial Municipal Corp Act 1949, the Gujarat Municipalities Act 1963, and the Gujarat Panchayat's Act 1993.

The new rule applies to the elections to all seven municipal corporations, 159 municipalities, 26 district panchayats, 223 taluka panchayats and in 13,713 village panchayats of the state. The Governor of Gujarat OP Kohli in first week of November 2014 signed the Gujarat Local Authorities Laws (Amendment) Act 2009 and gave his sanction for implementation.

According to the act, voters will have to compulsorily vote in local body elections. The act also provides 50 percent reservation for women in all local body's elections. With passage of this act, Gujarat became the first state of the country to make compulsorily voting in local body elections. The act was passed by the legislative assembly twice in 2009 and 2011 when Narendra Modi was Chief Minister of the state.

Provisions of the act says that any person who fails to vote during the local body elections is liable for punishment and will be penalised, however, the nature of penalty that would be taken against defaulters has not been disclosed.
